The Red Crescent Society of Turkmenistan was established in 1926 and it has its headquarters in Ashgabat, Turkmenistan.

External links
Official website

Medical and health organizations based in Turkmenistan
Turkmenistan
Organizations established in 1926
1926 establishments in the Turkmen Soviet Socialist Republic